Ernst Aleksander Grönlund (18 December 1902, in Helsinki – 13 February 1968, in Helsinki) was a Finnish footballer and bandy player.

Football career
He earned 37 caps at international level between 1931 and 1940, scoring 11 goals. He also represented Finland at the 1936 Summer Olympics.

At club level Grönlund played for Töölön Vesa, HIFK, HJK, KaPS and Jyry.

Bandy career
He capped 7 times at international level and won Finnish Championship 4 times.

Honours

Football
Finnish Championship: 1931, 1933, 1937

References

External links

1902 births
1968 deaths
Finnish footballers
Finland international footballers
Finnish bandy players
Association football forwards
Olympic footballers of Finland
Footballers at the 1936 Summer Olympics
HIFK Fotboll players
Footballers from Helsinki
20th-century Finnish people